Aliaksandr Apanasionak (born March 17, 1981) is a Belarusian boxer who participated in the 2004 Summer Olympics in the men's super heavyweight division (+ 91 kg). He qualified for the 2004 Summer Olympics by ending up in second place at the 1st AIBA European 2004 Olympic Qualifying Tournament in Plovdiv, Bulgaria.

Career
At Athens he lost in the first round to Aleksey Masikin 5:23.
See Boxing at the 2004 Summer Olympics – Super heavyweight

External links
data

Heavyweight boxers
World boxing champions
1981 births
Living people
Boxers at the 2004 Summer Olympics
Olympic boxers of Belarus
Belarusian male boxers
21st-century Belarusian people